Konya Province, in southwest Central Anatolia, is the largest province of Turkey.  The provincial capital is the city of Konya. It's traffic code is 42.

The Kızılören solar power plant in Konya will be able to produce 22.5 megawatts of electricity over an area of 430,000 square meters.

Geography 

Lake Tuz (Turkish: Tuz Gölü,) is the second largest lake in Turkey. It supplies much of the country's salt needs. Lake Beyşehir is on the western side of Konya province in a national park. It is the largest freshwater lake in Turkey and is important for local tourism, attracting thousands of people to its two beaches and twenty-two islands each year.

Konya has several caves in it's borders, such as Balatini Cave in Beyşehir, Büyü Düden Cave in Derebucak, Körükini Cave in Beyşehir and Tınaztepe Caves in Seydişehir.

Demographics

In 2011 the Konya Metropolitan Municipality had a population close to 1.1 million, out of the 2 million in the Konya Province (76.2% of the population in Konya Province lives in the city, while the remainder live in the villages, sub-districts and districts.)

Language census
Official first language results (1927-1965)

Divisions
The province of Konya is divided into thirty-one districts three of which (Meram, Selçuklu and Karatay) form part of Konya city.

The following districts are located in the Mediterranean Region: Ahırlı, Beyşehir, Bozkır, Derebucak, Hadim, Hüyük, Seydişehir, Taşkent, Yalıhüyük.

See also 
 Konya Province, Ottoman Empire
 Blue Tunnel Project

References

External links